Gigi Vorgan (born August 3, 1958) is an American writer and producer who appeared in numerous feature films and television projects before joining her husband Dr. Gary Small to cowrite iBrain, The Memory Prescription, The Longevity Bible, and The Memory Bible. She worked as a child actress, then she made an hiatus, and when she was 18 years old she got a call from her agent to go down to Universal and meet the producer and director of Jaws 2. She also worked in Rain Man (1988) and Red Dawn (1984).

Filmography

References

External links
 

1958 births
Film child actresses
American child actresses
21st-century American women writers
21st-century American screenwriters
20th-century American screenwriters
20th-century American women writers
Writers from Los Angeles
Living people